František Říha (born March 8, 1935) is a Czechoslovak sprint canoeist who competed in the early 1960s. He finished sixth the K-2 1000 m event at the 1960 Summer Olympics in Rome.

References

1935 births
Canoeists at the 1960 Summer Olympics
Czechoslovak male canoeists
Czech male canoeists
Living people
Olympic canoeists of Czechoslovakia